This was the first edition of the tournament.

Rebecca Marino won the title, defeating Alycia Parks in the final, 7–6(7–0), 6–1.

Seeds

Draw

Finals

Top half

Bottom half

References

Main Draw

Arcadia Women's Pro Open - Singles